NH 128 may refer to:

 National Highway 128 (India)
 New Hampshire Route 128, United States